HD 100777 is a single star with a planetary companion in the equatorial constellation of Leo. The distance to the star is approximately 162 light years based on parallax measurements.

The International Astronomical Union held the NameExoWorlds campaign in 2019. Nepal named the star  Sagarmatha("similar to Nepali name of the  Mt. Everest") and the exoplanet revolving it was named as Laligurans, the Nepali name of the flower Rhododendron.

This is an ordinary G-type main-sequence star with a stellar classification of G8V. It has a similar mass, size, and luminosity to the Sun. The star is roughly five billion years old with an inactive chromosphere and is spinning with a projected rotational velocity of 1.7 km/s. A 2015 survey ruled out the existence of any additional stellar companions at projected distances from 18 to 369 astronomical units.

Planetary system
In 2007, a giant exoplanet companion was found using the radial velocity method. The inclination of the orbital plane of this body is unknown, so only a lower limit on the mass can be determined. It has at least 1.16 times the mass of Jupiter.

See also
 HD 190647
 HD 221287
 List of extrasolar planets

References

G-type main-sequence stars
Planetary systems with one confirmed planet

Leo (constellation)
BD-03 3147
100777
056572